The Battle of Nagapatam was an indecisive naval battle on 3 August 1758 during the Seven Years' War. A British squadron under Vice-Admiral George Pocock fought a French squadron under Comte d'Aché off the Carnatic coast of India near Negapatam in the second of three battles fought between the two admirals during the war. Both squadrons suffered heavy damage during the short but fierce engagement, with d'Ache's flagship Zodiaque catching fire and d'Ache himself severely wounded. He would spend the remainder of the year recovering in Mauritius.

Citations

References

External links
Battle of Negapatam, 3rd August 1758 at threedecks.org

Conflicts in 1758
Naval battles of the East Indies Campaign (1757–1763)
Battle of Nagapatam
Battle of Nagapatam
Third Carnatic War
Naval battles involving France
Naval battles involving Great Britain
History of Tamil Nadu